A slip catching cradle is a device used by cricketers to practice taking catches.  

It consists of long, thin ash lathes over a bowed metal frame and is commonly used at most cricket clubs. It was invented by the Reverend Gilbert Harrison Bartlett.

References

Cricinfo
Wisden Cricketers' Almanack 1959 (Obituaries)

Cricket equipment
Cricket terminology